Kiliaen van Rensselaer (August 24, 1663 – 1719), the eldest child of Jeremias and Maria van Cortlandt van Rensselaer was born in Rensselaerwyck.

Life
He was patroon of Rensselaerwyck from 1687 to 1719, and second Lord of Manor of Rensselaerswyck. As the estate of his grandfather, Kiliaen van Rensselaer, the original patroon was yet held in common among the heirs, he negotiated a settlement with through his cousin Kiliaen of Amsterdam, son of Jan Baptist, whereby the heirs in Holland received the properties there, and the heirs in America received the American holdings. 

In May 1704, Kiliaen received a new patent from Queen Anne for the Manor of Rensselaerwyck. The following month he signed over the 60,000 acre Lower Manor (Claverack) to his younger brother, Hendrick van Rensselaer (1667–1740).

He was a member of the New York governor's council from 1704 to his death in 1719, and also served as Commissioner of Indian Affairs.

Family
On October 15, 1701, he married Maria Van Cortlandt, daughter of Stephanus and Gertrude (Schuyler) and had the following children:
Maria van Rensselaer (b. 1702), who married Frederick van Cortlandt
Gertrude van Rensselaer (1703–1704), who died young 
Jeremias van Rensselaer (1705–1745), sixth patroon and third Lord of the Manor of Rensselaerwyck, died unmarried and had no children
Stephen van Rensselaer (1707–1747), seventh patroon and fourth Lord of the Manor, who married Elizabeth Groesbeck
Johannes van Rensselaer (d. 1719)
Gertrude van Rensselaer (b. 1714), who first married Adonijah "Adonis" Schuyler (1708–1763) of the New Jersey Schuyler family. After his death, she married Robert, third Lord of Livingston Manor
John Baptist van Rensselaer (1717–1763), who died unmarried
Anna van Rensselaer, who married John Schuyler (1710–1773), brother of Adonis Schuyler.

The family lived at the Manor House located on the flats along the Hudson, east of the river road, about a mile north of the center of the city of Albany.

He was succeeded as Lord of the Manor by his son, Jeremias van Rensselaer.

Notes

References
 

1663 births
1719 deaths
American people of Dutch descent
Kiliaen 5th patroon
New Netherland
People of New Netherland
Members of the New York General Assembly